Paul Denis may refer to:

 Paul Denis (cyclist), French cyclist
 Paul Denis (Haiti politician), politician of the Democratic Convergence of Haiti and the Haitian Justice Minister
 Paul Denis (Quebec politician), lawyer and political figure in Quebec